A donkey jacket is a medium-length workwear jacket, typically made of unlined black or dark blue thick Melton woollen fabric, with the shoulders back and front reinforced and protected from rain with leather or PVC panels.

Originating in the United Kingdom, the garment is untailored at the waist such that it hangs down straight from the shoulders. The front vertical edges fall straight and are squared-off at the bottom edge which is also straight horizontally with no vent at the back. It has no lapels and is closed by four to five buttons at the front that fasten tightly up to the neck with a broad and stiff turn-up collar, allowing the wearer to protect the neck from wind, cold and wet weather. It is thus well suited to outdoors work in demanding conditions.

Origins 

In 1888 George Key opened up his own shop above his father John Key's first-floor draper shop on Lower Brook Street in Rugeley, Staffordshire, England. That same year, Key designed a new type of coat made of a hard-wearing material developed for those who were working on the construction of the Manchester Ship Canal. Some of the navvies worked on donkey engines (a steam-powered winch or logging engine), providing the inspiration for the name of George Key's new coat: the donkey jacket.

Design 
The donkey jacket is derived from the wool sack coat worn by workers in the 19th century, and the Oxford English Dictionary references the term as first used in 1929: "one with leather shoulders and back". The jacket usually has two capacious side pockets, and sometimes an inside "poacher's pocket".

Later versions replaced the leather with a PVC panel covering the shoulder-blade areas. This could be fluorescent orange or yellow and is sometimes branded with the name of the company which supplied the jacket, or the name of the company for which the wearer worked.

Social significance 
The donkey jacket is regarded as typical of the British manual labourer and trade unionist as well as members of the political left. It is also favoured by traditionalist Teddy boys, Rockabillys and skinheads. Former British Labour Party leader Michael Foot was criticised for wearing what was described incorrectly as a "donkey jacket" at a Remembrance Day wreath laying ceremony and he was shown wearing one on several covers of the satirical magazine Private Eye, and mentioned in Jeffrey Archer's best selling novel, "This Was a Man," at 177.  Foot's office insisted it was actually a "very expensive short overcoat" chosen by his wife, from Harrods.

References 

Jackets
British fashion